More Betterness! is a studio album by punk rock band No Use for a Name, released in 1999. 

"Fairytale of New York" is a cover of The Pogues' original, which features guest vocals from Cinder Block of the band Tilt.

Release
More Betterness! was released in October 1999. No Use for a Name co-headlined the Fat Tour, with the Mad Caddies, in February and March 2000. They embarked on a tour of Australia in June 2000. In November 2001, the band toured Arizona and California with Zero Down, HBA, and Diesel Boy.

Critical reception
Exclaim! wrote that the album "has the requisite guitar harmonics and occasional thrashing drum part, but mostly it is a pop record along the lines of Blink 182." The Los Angeles Times called More Betterness! "the band’s best-regarded full-length." CMJ New Music Report called it "intelligent punk rock" and a "refreshing change of pace." The Washington Post called the album "energetic," but noted that all the songs "tend to sound the same."

Track listing
All songs written by Tony Sly, except where noted.
 "Not Your Savior" – 3:45
 "Life Size Mirror" – 3:10
 "Chasing Rainbows" – 2:49
 "Lies Can't Pretend" – 2:48
 "Why Doesn't Anybody Like Me?" – 3:09
 "Sleeping In" – 3:06
 "Fairytale of New York" (Jem Finer, Shane MacGowan) – 4:04
 "Pride" – 3:06
 "Always Carrie" – 2:46
 "Let It Slide" – 2:15
 "Six Degrees from Misty" – 2:39
 "Coming Too Close" – 3:18
 "Saddest Song" – 4:00
 "Room 19" – 3:20

Personnel
No Use for a Name
 Tony Sly - vocals and guitar
 Chris Shiflett – guitar
 Matt Riddle – bass
 Rory Koff – drums
Additional musicians

 Cinder Block - backing vocals on "Fairytale of New York"

References

No Use for a Name albums
1999 albums
Fat Wreck Chords albums
Albums produced by Ryan Greene